Igor Alberto Secundino Silva (born 22 October 1984) is an Angolan road racing cyclist, who currently rides for UCI Continental team .

Major results

2006
 1st  Time trial, National Road Championships
2007
 1st  Time trial, National Road Championships
2010
 National Road Championships
1st  Road race
1st  Time trial
2011
 National Road Championships
1st  Road race
1st  Time trial
2012
 National Road Championships
1st  Road race
1st  Time trial
2013
 National Road Championships
1st  Road race
1st  Time trial
2014
 National Road Championships
1st  Road race
1st  Time trial
2015
 National Road Championships
1st  Road race
1st  Time trial
 1st Overall Tour of the Democratic Republic of Congo
1st Stages 1 & 3
2016
 1st  Time trial, National Road Championships
2017
 National Road Championships
1st  Road race
2nd Time trial
2018
 National Road Championships
3rd Road race
3rd Time trial
2019
 3rd Overall Tour of Egypt
2022
 2nd Time trial, National Road Championships

References

External links

1984 births
Living people
Angolan male cyclists